The Volkswagen Jetta A1 is the first generation of the Volkswagen Jetta compact car, produced by Volkswagen. Although the Golf reached considerable success in the North American markets, Volkswagen observed the hatchback body style lacked some of the appeal to those who preferred the traditional three-box configuration. The styling of the 1970 AMC Gremlin was controversial for truncating the Hornet sedan, but Volkswagen stylists reversed the process by essentially grafting a new trunk onto the tail of the Golf to produce a larger Jetta saloon. The Jetta became the best-selling European car in the United States, Canada and Mexico. Sales were slower in Europe, but were strong enough for Volkswagen to develop future generations of the Jetta.

History

The Jetta was introduced to the world at the 1979 Frankfurt Auto Show. Production of the first generation began in August 1979 at the Wolfsburg plant. In Mexico, the Mark 1 was known as the "Volkswagen Atlantic".

The car was available as a two-door sedan (replacing the aging rear-engined, rear-wheel drive Volkswagen Beetle 2-door sedan in the United States and Canada) and four-door sedan body styles, both of which shared a traditional three-box design. Like the Volkswagen Golf Mk1, its angular styling was penned at ItalDesign, by Giorgetto Giugiaro. Styling differences could be found depending on the market. In most of the world, the car was available with composite headlamps, while in the US, it was only available with rectangular sealed beam lamps due to Federal Motor Vehicle Safety Standard 108 (FMVSS 108). The suspension setup was identical to the Golf and consisted of a MacPherson strut setup in front and a twist-beam rear suspension. It shared its 2,400 mm (94.5 in) wheelbase with its hatchback counterpart, although overall length was up by 380 millimetres (15 in). The capacity of the luggage compartment was 377 litres (13.3 ft3), making the Jetta reasonably practical. To distinguish the car from the Golf, interiors were made more upscale in all markets. This included velour seating and color coordinated sill to sill carpeting.

Engine choices varied considerably depending on the local market. Most were based on 827 engines of the era. Some cars were equipped with carburetors, while others were fuel-injected using K or KE Jetronic supplied by Robert Bosch GmbH.

Volkswagen briefly considered producing the Jetta in a plant located in Sterling Heights, Michigan in the US. However, due to declining sales in North America, the decision was postponed and abandoned in 1982. The site was subsequently sold to Chrysler in 1983 and is still in operation . This generation was also produced in SFR Yugoslavia, Bosnia and Herzegovina, under the joint venture Tvornica Automobila Sarajevo (TAS) for the Balkan area.

USA and Canada
In North America, the Jetta was introduced for the 1980 model year. Specs were nearly identical for 49-state and Californian cars, although at  torque was one pound-foot lower in 49-state cars. Those received a two-way catalytic converter and exhaust gas recirculation, while the Californian Jettas received a three-way catalyst and lambda sensor. The three-way catalyst electronics system required extra space and replaced the glovebox in early Californian cars.

The dashboard was also upgraded (including the return of the glovebox on California cars) as were the seats and ventilation system.

Safety
Volkswagen was an early adopter of passive restraint systems. The first generation cars could be equipped with an "automatic" shoulder belt mounted to the door. The idea was to always have the belt buckled thereby doing away with the requirement that the driver and passenger remember to buckle up. Instead of a lap belt, the dashboard was designed with an integrated knee bar to prevent submarining underneath the shoulder belt. One quirk was that cars with this system lost the central dash air vents (unless equipped with an AC). The passive system was standard on 1980 California cars but was not available elsewhere in the United States until later.

In crash tests conducted by the National Highway Traffic Safety Administration, the Mark 1 received five out of five stars in a 56 km/h (35 mph) frontal crash test for both driver and passenger protection.

Testing and review
The first generation was met with generally positive reviews. Testers found the car handled precisely, although the lack of power steering contributed to heavy steering when parking. The brakes worked well for a car of the day, but some brake fade was evident. The ride was taut but firm in the typical style of German cars, with large bumps being well absorbed by the suspension but smaller undulations coming through. Reviews differed on noise levels, some found the car fairly quiet, while others thought the engine contributed to higher noise levels. Critics found the seating comfortable, but noted that the rear seat lacked sufficient head room. Most major controls and displays such as the speedometer and climate controls were well liked, but some secondary switches were not well placed or intuitive. The aforementioned automatic seat belts in some markets that were attached to the door frame made it impossible to forget to buckle the belt, but it was difficult to enter the car with a package in hand. Writers liked that the luggage space was generous, especially for a car of its size. Additionally, numerous storage areas also gave practicality to the sedan. In one test, the car scored nearly as high as the more expensive Volkswagen Passat/Dasher and the Audi 80/4000.

The Volkswagen Atlantic was introduced in the Mexican market in February 1981. The sole competition for the Atlantic in the Mexican market was the Renault 18. The Mark 1 continued to be manufactured and marketed in South Africa after the introduction of the Mark 2, badged as the "Fox". South African Foxes have the regular Golf front treatment, with round headlamps rather than the square ones used internationally. The Fox, like its CitiGolf sibling, received a facelift around 1990, with bigger, more rounded bumpers and a new grille. The Fox continued to be built until at least 1999.

See also

Volkswagen A platform
Volkswagen Jetta
Volkswagen Golf Mk1
Small family car

References

Cars introduced in 1979
1980s cars
Jetta 1
Euro NCAP small family cars
Front-wheel-drive vehicles
Italdesign vehicles
Cars discontinued in 1984